Gelochelidon is a genus of terns. It was considered a monotypic genus until the Australian tern was split from the gull-billed tern.

Taxonomy
The genus Gelochelidon was introduced in 1830 by the German zoologist Alfred Brehm. The type species is the gull-billed tern. The name combines the Ancient Greek gelaō meaning "to laugh" with khelidōn meaning "swallow".

The genus contains 2 species:

References

Bird genera
Laridae
Taxa named by Christian Ludwig Brehm